Siri Kolu (born July 18, 1972, in Kouvola) is a Finnish writer and playwright, best known for her novel Me Rosvolat (2010), which won her a Finlandia Junior Award and was subsequently adapted into a film in 2015.

References 

1972 births
Living people
Finnish writers
Finnish women writers
Finnish women novelists
Finnish novelists
Finnish dramatists and playwrights
Finnish women dramatists and playwrights